Randall Druz (born February 26, 1958) is an American former professional tennis player.

Born in Illinois, Druz won state doubles championships while at Hinsdale Central High School. He played collegiate tennis for Indiana University from 1977 to 1980, earning All-Big Ten honors as a senior.

Druz competed on the professional tour in the 1980s, with main draw appearances at Wimbledon and the US Open.

References

External links
 
 

1958 births
Living people
American male tennis players
Tennis players from Chicago
Indiana Hoosiers men's tennis players
People from Elmhurst, Illinois